Leslie Heráldez Sevillano (born 30 March 1993) is a Panamanian  footballer who plays as a defensive midfielder for local club Árabe Unido and the Panama national team.

References 

1993 births
Living people
Panamanian footballers
C.D. Árabe Unido players
Panama international footballers
Association football midfielders
2017 CONCACAF Gold Cup players